Penumuru is a village in Chittoor district of the Indian state of Andhra Pradesh. It is the mandal headquarters of Penumuru mandal.

Geography 
It has an average elevation of 368 meters.

References 

Villages in Chittoor district
Mandal headquarters in Chittoor district